Frank Stanley Cerveny (born ) was the sixth bishop of the Diocese of Florida and the 699th bishop in the Episcopal Church in the United States of America, a province of the Anglican Communion.

Early years
Frank Cerveny was born in Ludlow, Massachusetts, in the Springfield, Massachusetts metropolitan area and grew up during the Depression. He graduated from Trinity College in 1955 with a Bachelor of Arts, then earned a master of divinity from the General Theological Seminary in 1958. Cerveny has been awarded four honorary doctorates.

His first parish was in Miami, Florida, at Church of the Resurrection, where he was ordained as a priest in December 1958. Next, Reverend Cerveny served on the staff of Trinity Church in New York City for several years. He married Emmy Thomas Pettway on November 1, 1961, and they had three children. He became rector of St. Luke's Episcopal Church in Jackson, Tennessee, in the fall of 1963, then led St. John's Episcopal Church in Knoxville, Tennessee, beginning in 1969.

Reverend Cerveny was called to Jacksonville, Florida, in July 1972 and served as dean at St. John's Cathedral. He was elected bishop coadjutor on February 23, 1974, and consecrated on May 23, 1974, as the 6th bishop of the Episcopal Diocese of Florida.

Episcopacy
During his 18 years as bishop, membership in the diocese grew, a site for a new diocean camp was acquired near Live Oak, Florida, Camp Weed was constructed, as was a conference center (which was named in Cerveny's honor). The Episcopal Foundation was established and two programs were begun to help Cuban Episcopalians: Partners in Mission and Companion Diocese relationships. Christian Healing Ministries, created by Doctors Francis and Judith MacNutt in 1981, was embraced by Bishop Cerveny and relocated to Jacksonville, where their international outreach gave hope and comfort to people throughout the world.

Bishop Cerveny served as a member on the National Board for Theological Education; chairmanships included the Presiding Bishop's Select Committee, Deans and Bishops Committee, and the Environmental Stewardship Team. He was a trustee for the University of the South, an official seminary of the Episcopal Church, USA.

In 1992, he retired as bishop and joined the Church Pension Group (CPG) in New York City as executive vice president. He also served as president of the Compass Rose Society.

Bishop Cerveny returned to Jacksonville in 1999 and served as clerical trustee of the Jessie Ball duPont Fund from 1998 until the organization's rules required that he retire at age 70. He then became a trustee of the Community Foundation in Jacksonville. He and his wife reside on the St. Johns River in Ortega.

See also

List of Episcopal bishops (U.S.)

References

External links
Compass Rose Society
Episcopal Diocese of Florida-Bishop Cerveny
Episcopal Church Pension Group
Jessie Ball duPont Fund
Community Foundation of Jacksonville, Trustees

1933 births
Living people
People from Ludlow, Massachusetts
Trinity College (Connecticut) alumni
General Theological Seminary alumni
Episcopal bishops of Florida